Dr. Henry Evelyn Derrick Scovil, better known as H. E. D. Scovil or Derrick Scovil (1923-2010), was a physicist noted for his contributions to masers  and bubble memory.

Scovil received his D. Phil. in 1951 from University of Oxford for his thesis "Investigation of Paramagnetic Substances at Centimetre Wave-Lengths", studied paramagnetic resonance at Clarendon Laboratory, then moved to Bell Labs where he, George Feher, and H. Seidel built the first tunable, solid state maser. In the late 1950s he and colleagues constructed ruby travelling wave masers, cooled to 4.2K by liquid helium, which were then the world's lowest-noise microwave amplifiers. They were used by Arno Penzias and Robert Woodrow Wilson in their investigations of the cosmic microwave background.

Scovil was awarded the Franklin Institute's 1972 Stuart Ballantine Medal and the 1975 IEEE Morris N. Liebmann Memorial Award "for the concept and development of single-walled magnetic domains (magnetic bubbles), and for recognition of their importance to memory technology". He is a member of the National Academy of Engineering.

Dr. Scovil was born in 1923 in Victoria, British Columbia, Canada and received his Master's degree in physics from the University of British Columbia, where he later briefly taught. He died May 11, 2010 in Port Townsend, Washington, United States. He was predeceased by his wife, Gwendolyn, and survived by his son, Alistair (married to the writer Adrianne Harun) and two grandsons, Peter Angus Scovil and Duncan Christopher Henry Scovil.

Selected works
 
 
 
 
 Andrew H. Bobeck and H. E. D. Scovil, "Magnetic Bubbles", Scientific American, Vol. 224, No. 6, pages 78–91, June 1971.

References
 Clarendon: Thesis List
 A Modest Prehistory of Low Temperature Detectors, by Georges Waysand 
 National Academy of Engineering entry 
 Optics and Laser Spectroscopy, interview with Arthur L. Schawlow
 Photograph

1923 births
2010 deaths
Canadian physicists
Alumni of the University of Oxford
Members of the United States National Academy of Engineering
People from Victoria, British Columbia
Scientists at Bell Labs
Canadian expatriates in the United Kingdom
Canadian expatriates in the United States